The term capitalist republic is sometimes used to refer to a republican form of government existing under a capitalist economic system. The term is typically employed by socialist critics of capitalism, to distinguish between capitalist republics and socialist republics. More rarely, the been used in self-description.

In On New Democracy, Mao Zedong distinguished his vision of a New Democratic Republic from a capitalist republic, which he characterized as an "old European-American form" of government that was "out of date".

A capitalist republic was the goal of Sean Murray in the Irish Republicanism movement in the 1930s.  At a meeting in Rathmines, Murray advocated a capitalist republic for Ireland, taking what commentators have described as a "stages" approach in moving from national freedom towards a socialist state. Murray advocated first the achievement of national freedom, to form a capitalist republic, followed by a transition from a capitalist republic to a socialist republic.

Other Republicans, such as Gilmore and O'Donnell, sought the same goal by reversing the stages, arguing that the uprooting of capitalism through struggle will consequently lead to national independence.  Mike Milotte has noted that although Murray advocated a capitalist republic, "by avoiding the prefix its precise class nature was obscured".

References

See also
State capitalism

Capitalism
Republic